Vipavski Križ is a settlement on a small hill in the Vipava Valley in the Municipality of Ajdovščina in the Littoral region of Slovenia. There is evidence of habitation on the hill in the pre-Roman period. The settlement was first mentioned in written documents dating to the 13th century. The houses in the village are clustered inside a defence wall around a castle from the late 15th century. It was built to protect the residents against Ottoman raids. In 1532 Vipavski Križ was declared a town. In 1636 a Capuchin monastery with a rich library was founded in the town and it is now open to visitors.

Name
The name of the settlement was changed from Sveti Križ (literally, 'holy cross') to Vipavski Križ (literally, 'Vipava cross') in 1955. The name was changed on the basis of the 1948 Law on Names of Settlements and Designations of Squares, Streets, and Buildings as part of efforts by Slovenia's postwar communist government to remove religious elements from toponyms.

Parish church
The parish church in the settlement is dedicated to the Exaltation of the Cross and belongs to the Diocese of Koper.

Notable people
Tobia Lionelli (1647–1714), Slovene preacher
Rudolf Perhinek (1906–1982), Yugoslav military officer, Chetnik

References

External links 

Vipavski Križ at Geopedia

Populated places in the Municipality of Ajdovščina